Convergence: The International Journal of Research into New Media Technologies is a quarterly peer-reviewed academic journal that covers the fields of communications and media. The current editors are Sarah Aitkinson (King's College London) and Helen Kennedy (Brighton University). It was founded in 1995 by Julia Knight and Alexis Weedon (University of Bedfordshire) who edited volumes 1-23. The journal set the agenda for research the social and cultural implications of the new media technologies. First published by John Libbey Media, and then The University of Luton Press, it is now published by SAGE Publications.

It has published research by Amy Bruckman, dana boyd, Mette Mortensen, Simone Murray, Kate Pullinger, T.L. Taylor, M Whiteman, Andre Caron, Jay Bolter, Henry Jenkins, Mark Deuze, amongst others.

Abstracting and indexing 
The journal is abstracted and indexed in:
 British Education Index
 Compendex
 Film and Television Literature Index
 Scopus
 Zetoc

External links 
 

SAGE Publishing academic journals
English-language journals
Quarterly journals
Publications established in 1995
Communication journals